Mount Ferry is a  mountain summit located within Olympic National Park in Jefferson County of Washington state. Mount Ferry is the eighth-highest peak in the Bailey Range, which is a subrange of the Olympic Mountains. In clear weather, the mountain can be seen from the visitor center at Hurricane Ridge. Its nearest higher neighbor is Mount Pulitzer,  to the southwest. Precipitation runoff from the mountain drains into tributaries of the Elwha and Hoh Rivers.

Etymology
This peak was named by the 1889-90 Seattle Press Expedition after Elisha P. Ferry (1825–1895), the first Governor of Washington. It was at Ferry's urging that the Seattle Press newspaper sponsored the expedition to make the first crossing of the Olympic Mountains. The mountain's name was originally affixed to the 6,283-ft peak (Mt. Pulitzer) to the southwest before it was moved to its present position.

Climate

Based on the Köppen climate classification, Mount Ferry is located in the marine west coast climate zone of western North America. Most weather fronts originate in the Pacific Ocean, and travel northeast toward the Olympic Mountains. As fronts approach, they are forced upward by the peaks of the Olympic Range, causing them to drop their moisture in the form of rain or snowfall (Orographic lift). As a result, the Olympics experience high precipitation, especially during the winter months. During winter months, weather is usually cloudy, but, due to high pressure systems over the Pacific Ocean that intensify during summer months, there is often little or no cloud cover during the summer. The months July through September offer the most favorable weather for viewing and climbing.

Geology

The Olympic Mountains are composed of obducted clastic wedge material and oceanic crust, primarily Eocene sandstone, turbidite, and basaltic oceanic crust. The mountains were sculpted during the Pleistocene era by erosion and glaciers advancing and retreating multiple times.

See also

 Olympic Mountains
 Geology of the Pacific Northwest

References

External links
 
 Mount Ferry: weather forecast

Olympic Mountains
Mountains of Washington (state)
Landforms of Olympic National Park
North American 1000 m summits
Mountains of Jefferson County, Washington